Midi or MIDI may refer to:

Music 

 MIDI, a communications protocol for media interfaces
 Midi (Hi-Fi system), a type of integrated hifi audio system
 Midi, Maxi & Efti, a Swedish musical group with African influences from the early 1990s

Entertainment 

 Berliner (format) or "midi", a newspaper format with pages normally measuring about

People 

 Domnall Midi (before 715–763), King of Mide and High King of Ireland
 Donnchad Midi (died 797), King of Mide from about 766, son of Domnall Midi
 General Midi (DJ), British breakbeats DJ, real name Paul Crossman
 Jin Midi (134 BC – 86 BC), Han Dynasty official of Xiongnu ethnicity

Transport 

 Bedford Midi, a medium-sized panel van produced in the period 1986—94 by GM Vauxhall
 Mitsubishi Fuso Aero Midi, a medium-duty bus built by Mitsubishi Fuso
 Brussels-South railway station, known as Bruxelles-Midi in French

Geography 
 Southern France (in colloquial French and some contexts in English)
 Midi-Pyrénées, a former administrative region of France
 Midi District, district of Hajjah Governorate in Yemen.

Other uses 

 Midi skirt, a mid-calf length skirt (1970s)
 Mid-IR Interferometric instrument or MIDI, a former instrument of the Very Large Telescope in Chile